East China Normal University (ECNU) is a comprehensive public research university in Shanghai, China. It was formed in 1951 by the merger of the Great China University (est. 1924) and Kwang Hua University (est. 1925) and originated from the St. John's College founded in 1879. Established as a normal school, it had an original mission to train teachers for secondary and higher education, but soon housed top-class researchers and developed into an elite research-intensive university.

As of 2020, ECNU is organized into 22 schools, colleges, and institutes, located in two campuses throughout Minhang and Putuo. The university comprises 2 affiliated schools across the Shanghai metropolitan area: NYU Shanghai in Pudong, Asia-Europe Business School in Zizhu International Education Park. It also maintains a National Forest Ecosystem Observation and Research Station in Tiantong National Forest Park, Ningbo.

ECNU is designated by the Ministry of Education of China as a Class A Double First Class University. Sponsored by the national program “Double First Class University Plan”, "Project 211" and "Project 985", the university is a frontrunner in the nation's research and innovation, and has been dubbed as the "Columbia of the East". The university also has strong ties with the China Meteorological Administration, State Oceanic Administration and the Chinese Academy of Sciences.

East China Normal University (ECNU) consistently features in the global top 400 research universities according to some of the most cited international university rankings such as ShanghaiRanking's Academic Ranking of World Universities, the Times Higher Education World University Rankings, and the U.S. News & World Report Best Global University Ranking.

History

Origins

East China Normal University traces its roots to the formation of the St. John's College (later to become St. John's University) in 1879, and its heritage has had a deep influence in the development of Chinese modern higher education.

In 1879, St. John's College was founded by William Jones Boone and Joseph Schereschewsky, Bishop of Shanghai, by combining two pre-existing Anglican colleges in Shanghai. In 1905, the college became St. John's University and was registered in Washington D.C. in the United States. It was the first institution to grant bachelor's degrees in China, starting in 1907.

After the May Thirtieth Movement in 1925, some academics and students left the St. John's University, later forming the private Kwang Hua University to support the labor and anti-imperialist movement during the middle period of the Republic of China era.

In 1924, after a student protest at the Xiamen University in Fujian some academics fled north to Shanghai, where they established what became the Great China University (also known as Daxia University).

Establishment of the university

After the founding of the People's Republic of China, East China Normal University was officially formed in 1951 by the merger of the Great China University and the Kwang Hua University, and was joined at the same time by a number of faculty members from Fudan University, Tongji University, University of Shanghai and East China PE Academy, making it the first national teacher’s training university of the People's Republic of China. This was done in part due to the government's desire to pool these institutions' resources into a single, stronger entity, cultivate talents with professional knowledge, and promote the development of education in the country.

In the 1950s, the Chinese government regrouped the country's higher education institutions in an attempt to build a Soviet-style system. Under this policy, most of the faculties from Saint John's University, Zhejiang University, University of Shanghai, Utopia University, and Aurora University were incorporated into ECNU to form a comprehensive multi-disciplinary university. Some of the academics at the Tongji University and Jiaotong University were also transferred to ECNU.

In March 1959, ECNU was authenticated as one of the first 16 National Key Universities in China, and this status was reaffirmed in 1978. From 1972 to 1980 (during the Cultural Revolution in mainland China), five schools including ECNU were merged to create Shanghai Normal University, and in 1980 its original name was resumed.

1980 to present

In June 1986, ECNU was selected to be one of the first 33 higher education institutions authorized, by the State Council, to establish their graduate schools. In 1996, ECNU passed the prerequisites appraisal and became one of universities sponsored by the major national program "Project 211". In 2006, the Ministry of Education and Shanghai Municipality signed into a partnership for co-sponsoring the development of the university, qualifying ECNU as a member of the "Project 985" and facilitating ECNU's efforts and progress toward a comprehensive, research-oriented and internationalized world-class university.

ECNU is now under the direct auspices of the Ministry of Education. The university sponsors or supervises publication of more than 20 academic journals and periodicals. The library collection exceeds 4,000,000 volumes. 25 primary or secondary schools are affiliated to the university.

International partnerships
The university has established strategic cooperative partnership with universities such as École Normale Supérieure and its group in France, the University of Pennsylvania and Cornell University in USA, Tokyo University and Kobe University in Japan, and the University of Melbourne in Australia, the University of Warwick in the UK, etc. It has been carrying out academic exchanges with over 150 universities and institutions of Great Britain, France, Germany, Japan, the United States, Canada, Australia, Korea, and Russia, etc. ECNU plays host to a CIEE satellite campus, where 100 American college students study each semester. The university also runs an Online College of the Chinese language in collaboration with the National Office for Teaching Chinese as a Foreign Language (NOCFL), which is the first of its kind to be established in the country with over 5,800 students in 137 countries and regions. In 2008, it set up the NOCFL Study and Training Base for International Chinese Teachers.

 In 2002 the Ecole Normale Supérieure in Paris, the École normale supérieure de Cachan, and the École normale supérieure de Lyon set up a Master's-PhD programme at East China Normal University in Shanghai. An ENS campus is housed in the ECNU at the Aspiring Researchers Institute and at the Franco-Chinese Advanced Studies Institute.
 In 2007, the EMLYON Business School opened the official EMLYON Asia Campus in the heart of the ECNU campus.
 In 2008, the Cornell-ECNU Center for Comparative Culture was jointly funded by Cornell University and ECNU.
 China's first Sino-American university – New York University Shanghai (NYU Shanghai) – was co-established by New York University and ECNU and was approved by the Ministry of Education in early 2011.

Study China Programme

Along with several other Chinese universities, East China Normal University has hosted the United Kingdom (UK) government-funded Study China Programme for a number of years. In this programme, students from UK institutions spend one to two summer months studying Mandarin Chinese and Chinese culture at a university in China. The programme is organised by the University of Manchester and is fully funded by UK government bodies, such as the Department of Business, Innovation and Skills. Its purpose is to strengthen ties between UK university students and China, in particular as relatively few British students enroll in degrees in China. The programme has increased relations between ECNU and numerous leading UK universities.

Diplomats' Program

Sponsored by Shanghai Municipal Education Commission and Shanghai Foreign Affairs Office, the Diplomats' Program has been organized by ECNU since 2011. In this program, consular officials from over 20 countries spend two months during summer studying at East China Normal University.

Academics

At present the university is made up of 24 full-time schools and colleges, 2 unconventional colleges and 5 advanced research institutes, with 58 departments offering 79 undergraduate programs. The university also comprises 3 affiliated schools: NYU Shanghai, Asia-Europe Business School and ECNU-UNC School of Sino-American Innovative Education.

Full-time schools and colleges
 Faculty of Education
 Faculty of Economics and Management
 School of Humanities and Social Science
 School of Social Development
 School of Foreign Languages
 International College of Chinese Studies
 School of Psychology and Cognitive Science
 Preschool and Special Education School
 School of Sports and Health
 School of Communication
 School of Art
 School of Design
 School of Urban and Regional Science
 School of Ecological and Environmental Sciences
 School of Geographic Sciences
 School of Life Sciences
 School of Chemistry and Molecular Engineering
 School of Science and Engineering
 School of Information Science and Technology
 School of Computer Science and Software Engineering
 International Teachers College of Chinese Language and Culture
 Meng Xiancheng College (Teachers College)
 School of Data Science and Engineering

Unconventional colleges
 College of Continuing Education
 College of Distance Education

Advanced research institutes
 Institute of Estuary and Coastal Research
 Institute for Advanced International and Regional Studies
 Institute for Advanced Interdisciplinary Studies
 Institute of Arts
 Si-mian Institute for Advanced Studies in Humanities

The Software Engineering Institute is one of the 35 statewide pilot schools of software engineering granted by Ministry of Education in 2001; the International College of Chinese Studies is among the eight State Bases for Teaching Chinese as a Foreign Language, certified by the Ministry of Education. ECNU is designated as one of the National Liberal Arts and Basic Sciences Training and Research Bases in its disciplines of Chinese, History, Mathematics, Geography, Psychology and Physics.

ECNU's Business School was founded by the pioneer of China's Economics and Financing studies, Prof. Chen Biao Ru. Hence, the Business School of ECNU inherited the good tradition and enjoys top reputation in the economic and financial circle in China.

The Ministry of Education's Training Center for Secondary School Principals at ECNU is a state base for the training of secondary school principals in Mainland China and advanced studies of those in Hong Kong, Macau and Taiwan. ECNU is the only university in China designated as a national training center for elite secondary school principals and enjoys the reputation as the "Whampoa Military Academy" for secondary school principals.

Research

The university is officially authorized to offer programs:

 in two of the Primary Disciplines and five of the Sub-Disciplines, which are enlisted as National Key Disciplines;
 in five of the disciplines, which are enlisted as Preparatory National Key Disciplines,
 in 12 disciplines enlisted as Shanghai Key Disciplines.

Key laboratories
It has two State Key Laboratories, one National Field Observation and Research Station, six Key Labs or Engineering Centers, and six Key Research Bases for Humanities and Social Sciences of the Ministry of Education. ECNU is authorized to offer 112 doctoral programs covering 14 Primary Disciplines, 178 master's programs in six specialties, i.e., Education, Public Administration, Engineering, Physical Education and Business Administration, and to set up 14 post-doctoral mobile research stations.

State key laboratories
State Key Laboratory of Estuarine and Coastal Research
State Key Laboratory of Precision Spectroscopy

Key laboratories of provincial level and ministerial level
Key Laboratory of Brain Functional Genomics, Ministry of Education
Key Laboratory of Geography-Information Science, Ministry of Education
Shanghai Institute of Brain Functional Genomics
Shanghai Key Laboratory of Regulatory Biology
Shanghai Key Laboratory of Green Chemistry and Green Chemical Process
Shanghai Key Laboratory of Urbanization and Ecological Restoration
Shanghai Key Laboratory of Trustworthy Computing

Key research bases in humanities and social science
Institute of Curriculum and Instruction
Institute of Modern Chinese Thought and Culture
Center for Russian Studies
Center for the Study of Chinese Characters and Their Applications
Institute of Schooling Reform and Development
Center for Modern Chinese City Studies

Joint Research Centre
Cornell-ECNU Center for Comparative Culture
KUL-ECNU Sino-Euro Culture Research Center
ECNU-UBC Joint Research Core Group on China in Modern World
Intercultural Education and Communication Research Center (with Humboldt University of Berlin)

Faculty and staff
ECNU has a faculty body of over 4,000, among whom there are 2000 full-time teachers (including over 1,200 professors or associate professors), 14 academicians of the Chinese Academy of Sciences or Chinese Academy of Engineering (six of them are academicians of both academies), 11 members of the State Council Academic Appraisal Committee, eight specially hired professors or lecture professors for the Yangtze Scholar Award Program sponsored by the Ministry of Education, nine "state-level talents" chosen by the New-Century Talents Project, ten National Outstanding Youth Fund award winner, 80 specially hired professors or lecture professors for ECNU's Zijiang Scholar Award Program, and 105 tenured professors.

Campus

With campuses in Minhang and Putuo District totalling an area of over 220 hectares.

North Zhongshan Road Campus (Putuo Campus)
The previous main campus was located in the Putuo District of Shanghai, formerly a campus of the Great China University. The campus is an enclosed campus of gardens, lawns, and historic buildings interspersed with modern facilities, in a location in downtown Shanghai. The university also provides transportation by shuttle bus to its new Minhang Campus.

The campus still houses a variety of scientific research institutions, such as State Key Laboratory of Estuarine and Coastal Research and State Key Laboratory of Precision Spectroscopy.

The university's athletic facilities include an outdoor track, outdoor basketball courts, indoor basketball courts, and indoor tennis and badminton courts.

Minhang Campus
The Minhang new campus is located in the Minhang District on the outskirts of metropolitan Shanghai. Most administrative and academic framework of the university and the majority of undergraduate and graduate students are situated at this campus, which is accompanied by the Minhang Campus of Shanghai Jiao Tong University.

Rankings and reputation 

ECNU has always been ranked the top two or three among the mainland Chinese universities in Education and Training according to the most recent QS World University Rankings by Subjects and Academic Ranking of World Universities by Subjects.

In 2021, it was ranked 37th globally in the Times Higher Education Rankings by Subjects  in "Education", which is historical strengths of the university as suggested in the name "Normal". East China Normal graduates employability rankings placed at # 151-200 in the world in the 2017 QS Graduate Employability Rankings. Globally, East China Normal University is regarded as a competitive university with a good reputation Chinese universities by the Times Higher Education World Reputation Rankings where it ranked 151-175th.

Global University Rankings of ECNU:

 2022 Academic Ranking of World Universities: 201–300th globally
 2022 U.S. News & World Report Best Global University Ranking: 321 globally
 2022 Times Higher Education World University Rankings : 301–350th globally

Admission 
East China Normal University is a highly selective university that only accepts students with a National College Entrance Examination score at top 0.5%.

Notable people

Alumni

Writer
Chen Danyan: Writer.
Dai Houying: Writer.
Ge Fei: Writer. Professor of literature at Tsinghua University.
Mu Shiying (穆时英): Writer.

Academics
Yu Lizhong: Chancellor of New York University Shanghai.
Wang Xingyu: President of East China University of Science and Technology (1994.03–2004.07).
Lu Shanzhen: President of Beijing Normal University (1995–1999).
Wu Haishun: President of Shanxi Normal University (2005.11-),
Jia Suotang: President of Shanxi University (2012.08-).
Zhu Min: Chair of the University Council of Donghua University (2012.11-).
Yuan Zihuang: Chair of the University Council of Hefei University of Technology (2014.05-).
Ma Qinrong: Chair of the University Council of Shanghai University of Finance and Economics (2004.07–2012.07).
Chen Dubin: Chair of the University Council of Fuzhou University (2007.03–2011.12).
Xi Nanhua: Academician of the Chinese Academy of Sciences. Vice-President of University of Chinese Academy of Sciences.
Song Daxiang: Academician of the Chinese Academy of Sciences.
Xue Yongqi: Academician of the Chinese Academy of Sciences.
Zhu Shiyao: Academician of the Chinese Academy of Sciences.
Liu Boli: Academician of the Chinese Academy of Engineering.
Stephen Cheng: Academician of the National Academy of Engineering, United States.
Lu Bai: Senior Investigator of National Institutes of Health.
Joe Z. Tsien: Neuroscientist, Georgia Health Sciences University.
He Jifeng: Academician of the Chinese Academy of Sciences and academic at ECNU.
Yuan Zhongyi: Archaeologist, praised as "the father of the Terracotta Warriors".
Mitchell Ho: Senior Investigator, National Institutes of Health.

In politics
Han Zheng: Vice President of China, Vice Premier of China, Member of the 19th Politburo Standing Committee.
He Xian: Vice Minister of the Ministry of Personnel of the P.R.China.
Chen Hao: Governor of Yunnan, China.
Yin Yicui: Chairwoman of the Shanghai People's Congress.

In business and media
Daniela Anahi Bessia: Celebrity performer for the China Central Television, Hunan Television, Shanghai Media Group, etc. | Culture and Entertainment.
Xue Peijian: President of Shanghai Media and Entertainment Group.
Jason Jiang: Founder of Focus Media.
Dong Qing: Television host.

In sport
Liu Xiang: Gold medalist of 110-meter hurdles in the 2004 Summer Olympics.

Study abroad
 Glenn Duffie Shriver: From Grand Valley State University, he did a study abroad program at ECNU. He was later convicted in the U.S. of attempting to commit espionage.

Notable faculty members 
 Meng Xiancheng: Educator, the first president of East China Normal University.
 Li Linsi: Educator and diplomat who has been recognized as one of the key figures in modern Chinese cultural and diplomatic history.
 Shen Zhihua: Professor of history at ECNU, expert in the history of the Soviet Union, Sino-Soviet relations, and the Cold War.
 Lü Simian: Chinese historian, former professor of history at ECNU.
 Shi Zhecun: Author, former professor of Chinese Language and Literature.
 Hu Huanyong: Demographer, forefather of modern Chinese demography and the founder of China's population geography.
 He Jifeng: Computer scientist, member of the Chinese Academy of Sciences.
 Ghil'ad Zuckermann: Linguist, revivalist.

Alumni associations
East China Normal University Alumni Association
East China Normal University Alumni Association in US
East China Normal University Alumni Association in North California

Addresses
 North Zhongshan Road (Putuo) Campus: 3663 North Zhongshan Road, Shanghai 200062, P.R. China.
 Minhang Campus: 500 Dongchuan Road, Shanghai 200241, P.R. China.

See also
 No. 1 High School Affiliated to East China Normal University
 No. 2 High School Attached to East China Normal University
 East China Normal University Press

References

External links
Official website 
Official Facebook page 
Campus Tour 
Global Education Center/International Students Office, ECNU 
NYU Shanghai（上海纽约大学） 

 
1951 establishments in China
Educational institutions established in 1951
Universities and colleges in Shanghai
Teachers colleges in China
Project 985
Project 211
Plan 111